Kirsten Stallknecht (1937 – 4 May 2021) was a Danish nurse who served as President of the International Council of Nurses. She received the 2013 Christiane Reimann prize from the ICN.

References 

Danish nurses
1937 births
2021 deaths
Women nurses
Danish trade union leaders
People from Copenhagen